Iron Men and Silver Stars is a collection of western short stories edited by Donald Hamilton. Hamilton's short story contribution, The Guns of William Longley, won the 1967 Western Writers of America Spur Award for best short material.

Contents
 Preface: The Great Tradition, Donald Hamilton, 7 (originally published in WWA newsletter The Roundup, April 1956)
 Green Wounds, Carter Travis Young, 11
 Epitaph, Tom W. Blackburn, 19
 In the Line of Duty, Elmer Kelton, 40
 Peace Officer, Brian Garfield, 57
 The Mayor of Strawberry Hill, Todhunter Ballard, 72
 Lawmen Stand Alone, Lin Searles, 87
 Coward's Canyon, John Prescott, 101
 The O'Keefe Luck, Wayne D. Overholser, 117
 The Hangman, Luke Short (writer), 127
 Lynch Mob at Cimmarron Crossing, Thomas Thompson, 165
 The Guns of William Longley, Donald Hamilton, 178 (first publication of this story)

Publication history
1967, USA, Fawcett, Gold Medal d1821, paperback

External links
 Review by Bruce Grossman at Bookgasm

1967 anthologies
Western (genre) short stories
Short story collections by Donald Hamilton